Hato Caves are show caves, publicly accessible since 1991 and a popular tourist attraction on the Caribbean island of Curaçao. The caves consist of marine coral limestone, which accumulated over millions of years and after sea levels had dropped were exposed to atmospheric corrosion and karstic processes.

Location 
The site is situated on the island's northern coast, north of the town of Willemstad on the Roosevelt Weg. The caves constitute layers and terraces. Several caves are to be found on the second terrace, the Hato Caves are exclusively located above on the third terrace.

History 
The earliest known inhabitants of the caves about 1,500 years ago were the Amerindian Arawaks and Caiquetio Indians, who also buried their dead in the caves. The numerous petroglyphs and cave drawings are attributed to these early occupants. Before the abolition of slavery, runaway slaves used the caves as hiding places.

See also 

 List of caves
 Caribbean people
 History of Curaçao

References

External links

 Hato Caves

Natural history of Curaçao
Caves of Curaçao
Petroglyphs in South America
Caves of the Caribbean